thumb|The Toronto sign at night
The Toronto Sign is an illuminated three-dimensional sign in Nathan Phillips Square in Toronto, Ontario, Canada, that spells the city's name.

History
Originally installed for the 2015 Pan American Games as a temporary attraction meant to be dismantled in November 2016 at the earliest, the City of Toronto decided to continue to operate the sign after it became popular with tourists and residents. Explaining the city's decision to keep it, Councillor Norm Kelly said the sign is as iconic as the CN Tower and that it has become known all over the world. It had appeared in an estimated 120 million pictures in various social media outlets by June 2016.

Having an estimated three- to five-year lifespan, the sign began to show signs of wear and tear by June 2016. Toronto City Council rejected spending another  on the sign, and city staff proposed replacing the sign with a permanent version. The sign was vandalized in October 2016 during the overnight Nuit Blanche event. Graffiti was applied using markers, but Nuit Blanche employees were able to remove the graffiti.

A 3D maple leaf was added to the Toronto sign adjacent to the final "O" in December 2016 to mark the 150th anniversary of Canadian Confederation. The sign was modified again in 2018 to mark National Indigenous Peoples Day. The change added a 3D medicine wheel adjacent to the first "T" and new vinyl wraps for each letter consisting of a birch bark pattern with various First Nations symbols on them. The wraps were removed, while the medicine wheel remains.

The sign experienced more wear in early 2017, due to uneven erosion at the bases of each of the three Os from hundreds of thousands of posing feet from those wanting to take pictures with the sign, exposing the black rubber padding underneath. In 2019, Toronto City Council reaffirmed its plan to replace the original sign with a robust, permanent structure. A resident of the rural community of Orono in Clarington, located east of Toronto, has requested that the original sign be donated to Orono.

On September 10, 2020, John Tory, the mayor of Toronto, officially announced that the sign was to be replaced with a permanent version by Toronto-based Unit 11 for $760,000, which includes the cost to remove the old sign, and is funded by both city reserve "rainy-day" funds and civic crowdfunding. The new sign would be easier to maintain and have augmented lighting capacity. The new sign was unveiled by Tory on September 18, 2020, and featured a wrap to commemorate the United Nations' International Decade for People of African Descent.

Lawsuit
Although the Toronto Sign is not an original idea and had been in European cities for many years, a local marketing consultant filed a lawsuit claiming he presented the idea to the city and staff before the city unveiled plans for the sign. Named in the  lawsuit is the City of Toronto government as well as Mayor Tory and councillors Josh Colle and Michael Thompson. 

The statement of defence, filed February 19, 2016, argues the concept itself is nothing new, and therefore the suit should be dismissed: "Interactive, three-dimensional signs bearing the name of a city are commonplace around the world. They can be found in Amsterdam, Guadalajara, Budapest, Istanbul and many other cities".  The civil lawsuit remains in the court system.

References

External links

 City of Toronto media release about the sign

Public art in Toronto
Individual signs